Radiant is a French comic series in manga style (manfra), written and illustrated by Tony Valente. It has been published by Ankama since 2013 and currently has 17 volumes released in French. The series has been published in English by Viz Media since 2018 and currently has 16 volumes released. It has also been published in Japanese by Asukashinsha under the Euromanga Collection imprint since 2015, making it the first manfra to become published in Japan. Additional languages it has been published are German by Pyramond since 2016, Italian Mangasenpai since 2017, and Spanish LetraBlanka since 2016. The manfra was adapted into a Japanese anime series that premiered in 2018.

Volume list

References



Radiant